Giancarlo Pagliarini (born 23 April 1942) is an Italian politician.

Born in Milan, he was later elected to the Italian Senate for Lega Nord in 1992 and re-elected in 1994, then elected to the Chamber of Deputies in 1996 and in 2001. He was Minister of the Budget in Berlusconi I Cabinet in 1994, "President of Padania" in 1996 and floor leader of Lega Nord in the Chamber of Deputies from 1999 to 2001.

He is married to a lady of Armenian origin whose family survived the Armenian genocide, they have a son and a daughter.

Before joining the League, Pagliarini worked as accountant and was close to the Radical Party, for its battle in favour of divorce. Anyway, he never joined that party, being only a voter, and so he made his first political experience in the League.

Pagliarini is a moderate, sometimes dissenting with the party's social-conservative agenda, a libertarian, especially on economic issues, and a prominent supporter of fiscal federalism and fiscal conservatism.

He was known as maverick politician and, prior to leaving Lega Nord, often criticized the line imposed by Umberto Bossi. Lately he dissented with the continuation of the alliance with the other House of Freedoms parties, favouring an autonomous path for the League, and flirted with the independentist wing of the party, led by Gilberto Oneto, a libertarian himself, and maintained relations with the Liberal Reformers.

On 19 January 2007 Pagliarini, who was not candidate for re-election in the 2006 general election, finally left Lega Nord. In June he took part to the libertarian network founded by Daniele Capezzone.

On 18 January 2008 he unexpectedly joined The Right of Francesco Storace and then was candidated in Lombardy in the 2008 general election, despite declaring to be remained "leghista nell'anima e nella mente" (leaguist in the soul and the mind). He wasn't elected.

He was a candidate for mayor of Milan for local elections in 2011, but he wasn't able to enter the runoff election.

Subsequently he joined Act to Stop the Decline, a federalist and liberal party.

References

External links
Official website

1942 births
Living people
Politicians from Milan
Lega Nord politicians
The Right (Italy) politicians
Government ministers of Italy
Senators of Legislature XI of Italy
Senators of Legislature XII of Italy
Deputies of Legislature XIII of Italy
Deputies of Legislature XIV of Italy
Italian libertarians